The 1996 ARL premiership (also known as the 1996 Optus Cup due to sponsorship from Optus) was the 89th season of professional rugby league football in Australia, and the second to be administered by the Australian Rugby League (ARL). Twenty teams contested the premiership, including five Sydney-based foundation teams, another six from Sydney, two from greater New South Wales, four from Queensland, and one each from New Zealand, the Australian Capital Territory and Western Australia. Ultimately two Sydney clubs, the Manly-Warringah Sea Eagles and St. George Dragons contested the grand final.

Teams 
The lineup of teams remained unchanged from the previous season except for the re-branding of the Gold Coast team from the "Seagulls" to the "Chargers" as the ARL took control of the club.

Regular season
With the Super League war in full effect off the field, those clubs affiliated with the breakaway competition refused to participate in five games of Round 1, all forfeited to ARL-aligned clubs and only four of the ten scheduled games took place. Of the two games between two Super League clubs, Canterbury versus North Queensland was cancelled, whilst Auckland flew a team consisting of players from the Otahuhu Leopards and Ellerslie Eagles clubs to Brisbane and were thus declared winners over the Broncos by forfeit.

Following up on their performance in the 1995 season up to the grand final, Manly-Warringah dominated the season with their defence, which conceded only 34 tries in 25 matches, the best record of any team since the six-tackle rule was introduced in 1971. Indeed, the Sea Eagles only conceded 191 points during the minor round, an average of only 8.7 points per game, while scoring 549 points at 24.9 points per game. Their 1995 rivals Canberra were hit by injuries which wiped out the seasons of key players including captain Ricky Stuart, Bradley Clyde and Jason Croker, and suspensions to Kiwi props John Lomax and Quentin Pongia.

Super League-aligned Canterbury were also hit by the loss of key players Jim Dymock, Dean Pay, Jason Smith and Jarrod McCracken to ARL-loyal Parramatta. Sydney City started the season in good form, but fell off after winning their first ten games, whilst Brisbane (with Allan Langer putting in some strong performances) dominated early but as had become their custom, lost ground mid-season during the Origin period. North Sydney, with a powerful forward pack and skillful goal-kicking half Jason Taylor feeding a superb set of outside backs, were expected to make the Grand Final, but as had become their habit in the 1990s they lost the preliminary final, this time to St. George.

The 20-team competition in 1995 and 1996 caused frequent jackpots in FootyTAB's "Pick The Margins" and after three successive rounds without a single winner, on 8 July 1996 after a last-minute Sydney City penalty goal, one punter received an all-time record for any form of sports betting in Australia: $2,006,217.

This year Canterbury-Bankstown back Terry Lamb set new record for most first-grade premiership games at 350 before retiring at the end of the season.

North Sydney's Jason Taylor won the official player of the year award, the Rothmans Medal, while the Dally M Medal was awarded to Brisbane's Allan Langer.

At the end of the season, ARL chief executive John Quayle resigned and was replaced by Balmain president (and former hooker) Neil Whittaker.

 
Bold – Home game
X – Bye
Opponent for round listed above margin

Ladder

Finals

 Although Brisbane's home ground during the 1996 ARL season was ANZ Stadium this game was played at Suncorp.

Grand Final

This was the last grand final to feature two Sydney-based teams until 2003. 40,985 people were at the Sydney Football Stadium for the game, the lowest attendance since 1989. The match was refereed by Queenslander David Manson. For St. George, it was their third Grand Final appearance in the 1990s and would prove to be their last as a stand-alone club. Manly, looking for their 6th premiership, had been beaten Grand Finalists in 1995.

This would be the third and final time the two clubs would meet in a Grand Final, with St George having been victorious on both previous occasions in 1957 and 1959.

The pre-game entertainment focused on the 40th anniversary of television in Australia, as match broadcaster Channel 9 had been the first TV station in 1956. Music artists who performed in the pre-game included Glenn Shorrock, The Delltones, Ross Wilson, Christine Anu, and Kate Ceberano, who sang a video replay duet of "I Still Call Australia Home" with the late Australian entertainer Peter Allen (as Allen had died in 1992, he only appeared on the stadiums video replay screen).

Kate Ceberano also performed the Australian national anthem.

1st half
In the 5th minute, Manly centre Craig Innes won the chase and scored after a grubber kick by his skipper Geoff Toovey. Matthew Ridge converted from the sideline for 6–0. The Dragons played on after being awarded a penalty in front of the posts in the 8th minute but failed to score. At the 15-minute mark, Saints' halfback Noel Goldthorpe conceded a penalty right in front of their goal post after committing a head-high tackle on Manly's Daniel Gartner. Ridge took the kick, extending the lead to 8–0. St. George sent in forward replacements Lance Thompson and David Barnhill for Scott Gourley and Kevin Campion (head cut). For Manly, Neil Tierney came off the interchange bench to replace David Gillespie. Up until the 19th minute mark when Manly veteran five-eighth Cliff Lyons took the field, their coach Bob Fulton was using six running forwards with captain Geoff Toovey as dummy half.

The Dragons' first points came in the 37th minute when Wayne Bartrim kicked a penalty that was awarded when Manly forward Owen Cunningham stripped the ball. From the ensuing kick-off just before half-time, the game's controversial moment occurred by means of a hotly disputed try. Ridge made a spectacular short kick-off and regathered, catching the Dragons unaware. St George hooker Nathan Brown appeared to tackle Ridge, albeit one-handedly and by the collar. Ridge got up and ran when Brown was expecting him to stop and play the ball. Referee David Manson ruled that Brown did not complete the tackle. Ridge was eventually tackled just a few metres from the line. From there, dummy half Nik Kosef then passed the ball to Steve Menzies, who stormed his way through the Saints' defense of Thompson, Dean Raper, Noel Goldthorpe and Wayne Bartrim to score next to the posts, giving Ridge an easy conversion kick. The controversial ruling by referee Manson gave Manly a 14–2 half-time lead and broke the Saints' resolve. In the process of scoring, Menzies injured his groin/hamstring; and, although he returned for the second half, he was unable to run and was eventually interchanged by coach Fulton.

2nd half
In the 53rd minute, Manly's Danny Moore scored a try from a Terry Hill pass after Hill drew Saints defenders Adrian Brunker and Nick Zisti. With Ridge off the field after being concussed in a tackle, Craig Innes converted from 5 metres off the sideline for the Sea Eagles to take a 20–2 lead. Five minutes later, Dragons' winger Zisti scored a try from a Bartrim cut-out pass. Bartrim then converted from the sideline for a final scoreline of 20–8. The final 20 minutes were scoreless, with two field goal attempts from Ridge charged down by Dragons' defenders. This ensured that the Sea Eagles secured their sixth official premiership and their only one of the 1990s.

Full-Time Score

Player statistics
The following statistics are as of the conclusion of Round 22.

Top 5 point scorers

Top 5 try scorers

Top 5 goal scorers

References 

 Rugby League Tables – Season 1996 
St. George Dragons 1996 season at showroom.com.au

National Rugby League seasons
ARL season
ARL season